The 1953 South American Basketball Championship was the 15th edition of this regional tournament. It was held in Montevideo, Uruguay and won by the host, Uruguay national basketball team. A record seven national teams competed. It was the first to follow the first World Championship in 1950.

Final rankings

Results

Each team played the other six teams once, for a total of six games played by each team and 21 overall in the preliminary round. The three-way tie between Chile, Peru, and Paraguay was broken by a sub-bracket; each was 1–1 against the other teams in that sub-bracket.  The point differentials within the bracket gave Chile the top spot in it with +5, Paraguay had +4, and Peru had -9.  This was mostly due to Chile's relatively large victory over Peru while the other two games (Peru-Paraguay and Chile-Paraguay) had both been much closer.

External links
FIBA.com archive for SAC1953

1953
S
B
1953 in Uruguayan sport
Sports competitions in Montevideo
Champ
1950s in Montevideo
April 1953 sports events in South America